The Karoo is a semi-desert region of South Africa.

Karoo may also refer to:

In earth sciences:
 Karoo-Ferrar, a major geologic province which mostly covers South Africa and Antarctica
 Karoo Supergroup, a stratigraphic unit in sub-Saharan Africa
 Karoo Ice Age, the second major ice age of the Phanerozoic Eon

In Astronomy:
Karoo (crater), an impact crater on Asteroid 253 Mathilde
Places:
 Karoo National Park, in the Western Cape, South Africa
 Karoo District Municipality, in the Northern Cape, South Africa
 Central Karoo District Municipality, in the Western Cape, South Africa
 Karoo Hoogland Local Municipality, in the Northern Cape, South Africa

Birds
 Karoo chat
 Karoo eremomela
 Karoo korhaan
 Karoo prinia
 Karoo scrub robin

Companies
 Karoo (internet service provider), an Internet Service Provider in the United Kingdom

Literature
 Saul Karoo, main character and narrator in Karoo, posthumous novel by Steve Tesich, published in 1998.

See also

Karlo (name)